Butimanu is a commune in Dâmbovița County, Muntenia, Romania. It is composed of four villages: Bărbuceanu, Butimanu, Lucianca and Ungureni. It is situated in the historical region of Muntenia.

Natives
 Constantin Prezan (1861–1943); a general during World War I, he was given in 1930 the honorary title of Marshal of Romania

References

Communes in Dâmbovița County
Localities in Muntenia